Marlene Fortunato (born 8 January 1970) is a Brazilian long-distance runner. She competed in the women's marathon at the 2004 Summer Olympics.

References

1970 births
Living people
Athletes (track and field) at the 2004 Summer Olympics
Brazilian female long-distance runners
Brazilian female marathon runners
Olympic athletes of Brazil
Place of birth missing (living people)
21st-century Brazilian women
20th-century Brazilian women